"Sigelwara Land" is an essay by J. R. R. Tolkien that appeared in two parts, in 1932 and 1934. It explores the etymology of the Old English word for the ancient Aethiopians, and attempts to recover what it might originally have meant. Tolkien suggested that its two elements were most likely sun/jewel and coal/hearth, perhaps meaning something like a soot-black fire-demon.

The Tolkien scholar and philologist Tom Shippey suggests that Tolkien's detailed study of the word may have influenced him in his creation of elements of his fantasy world of Middle-earth, including the Silmarils or forged sun-jewels, the Balrogs or dark fire-demons, and the Haradrim, men of the hot south.

Essay 
Tolkien's essay treats the etymology of the Old English word for the ancient Aethiopians, . Tolkien concluded that, while the meaning of the first element was evidently  "Sun", the meaning of the second element  was not definitely recoverable, but might be guessed at:

The phrase  appears in Exodus, a free translation of the Book of Exodus (Codex Junius 11):

He begins by pointing out that Ethiopians in the earliest writings are presented in a very positive light, but by the time they written of as "Sigelwarans", the perception has become the opposite.

that had been forgotten even before the composition of this version of Exodus.

Influence on Tolkien's fiction 

Tom Shippey notes that the demons "with red-hot eyes" make appearances in Tolkien's fiction as Balrogs.

One of the many peoples encountered in The Lord of the Rings are "black men like half-trolls". In drafts of The Lord of the Rings Tolkien toyed with names such as Harwan and Sunharrowland for the Haradrim generally and their land; Christopher Tolkien notes these names are derived from the Old English Sigelwara, and refers to Tolkien's essay Sigelwara Land.

See also 
 White Aethiopians
 Sowilō

Notes

References 

Essays by J. R. R. Tolkien
1932 essays
Works originally published in British magazines
Africa in mythology
Old English